Tarzán is a television series that aired in syndication from 1991–1994.  In this version of the show, Tarzan (Wolf Larson) was portrayed as a blond environmentalist, with Jane (Lydie Denier) turned into a French ecologist. The series aired in syndication in the United States.

Ron Ely, famous for playing Tarzan in the original series, played a character named Gorden Shaw in the first-season episode “Tarzan the Hunted”.

The lion in this series was originally performed by Josef of Monterey, California's zoo. Due to volunteering as a live action model for Mufasa in Disney's animated production of The Lion King, Josef was replaced by Sudan of Thousand Oaks, California's Animal Actors of Hollywood.

Episodes

Season one (1991–92)

Season two (1992–93)

 “Tarzan and the Missile of Doom”
 “Tarzan and the Forbidden Jewels”
 “Tarzan and the Broken Promise”
 “Tarzan and the Amazon Women”
 “Tarzan and the Karate Warriors”
 “Tarzan and the Lion Girl”
 “Tarzan and the Deadly Delusion”
 “Tarzan and the Primitive Urge”
 “Tarzan and the Mysterious Sheik”
 “Tarzan and the Runaways”
 “Tarzan Meets Jane”
 “Tarzan and the Wayward Balloon”
 “Tarzan and the Fugitive’s Revenge”
 “Tarzan and the Mutant Creature”
 “Tarzan Rescues the Songbird”
 “Tarzan and the Fire Field”
 “Tarzan and the Movie Star”
 “Tarzan and the Fountain of Youth”
 “Tarzan and the Law of the Jungle”
 “Tarzan and the Shaft of Death”
 “Tarzan and the Polluted River”
 “Tarzan’s Dangerous Journey”
 “Tarzan and the Toxic Terror”
 “Tarzan and the Earthly Challenge”
 “Tarzan and the Mysterious Fog”

Season three (1993–94)

 “Tarzan and the Hollywood Adventure”
 “Tarzan and the Witness for the Prosecution”
 “Tarzan and the Rock Star”
 “Tarzan and the Odd Couple”
 “Tarzan and the Return of the Bronx”
 “Tarzan and the New Commissioner”
 “Tarzan and the Stoneman”
 “Tarzan and the Deadly Cargo”
 “Tarzan and the Sapphire Elephant”
 “Tarzan and the Fear of Blindness”
 “Tarzan and the Mating Season”
 “Tarzan and the Gift of Life”
 “Tarzan and the Death Spiders”
 “Tarzan and the Russian Invasion”
 “Tarzan and the Fiery End”
 “Tarzan and the Curse of Death”
 “Tarzan and the King of the Apes”
 “Tarzan and the Evil Twin”
 “Tarzan and the Dangerous Competition”
 “Tarzan and the Pirates Revenge”
 “Tarzan and Cheeta’s Desperate Adventure”
 “Tarzan and the Sixth Sense”
 “Tarzan and the Ring of Romance”
 “Tarzan and the Night Horrors”
 “Tarzan and the Jewel of Justice”

Legacy

The show inspired the poem “Sunday, Tarzan in His Hammock” by Lewis Buzbee, which he wrote as "...revenge against Tarzan and cheerful aerobics instructors everywhere.”

References

External links
 

Tarzan television series
1990s Canadian drama television series
Canadian adventure television series
Canadian action television series
1991 Canadian television series debuts
1994 Canadian television series endings
French drama television series
French action television series
1991 French television series debuts
1994 French television series endings
Mexican drama television series
1991 Mexican television series debuts
1994 Mexican television series endings